Grimmer is a surname. Notable people with the surname include:

Abel Grimmer (c. 1570–c. 1620), Flemish painter
George S. Grimmer (1826–1887), Canadian lawyer and politician
Gerhard Grimmer (born 1943), East German cross-country skier
Jack Grimmer (born 1994), Scottish footballer
Jacob Grimmer (c. 1526–1590), Flemish painter
Margot Grimmer (born 1944), American ballet dancer
Robert Watson Grimmer (1866–1948), Canadian merchant and politician
Cheryl Gene Grimmer (b 1966), Australian child disappeared 12 January 1970.
W.C.H. Grimmer (1858–1945), Canadian lawyer and politician

See also
Grimmer Parish, New Brunswick
Mann & Grimmer M.1, World War I fighter aircraft